Riaz Durgahed (born 4 May 1977) is a Mauritian boxer. He competed in the men's bantamweight event at the 2000 Summer Olympics.

References

External links
 

1977 births
Living people
Mauritian male boxers
Olympic boxers of Mauritius
Boxers at the 2000 Summer Olympics
Mauritian people of Indian descent
African Games medalists in boxing
Bantamweight boxers
African Games silver medalists for Mauritius
Competitors at the 1999 All-Africa Games